Bonnie Lubega (born 1929) is an Ugandan novelist, fiction writer and lexicographer. He is the author of the novels The Burning Bush (1970) and The Outcasts (1971).

Early life and education
Lubega was born in Buganda, Uganda, in 1929, where he received his early education and qualified as a teacher. In the mid-1950s, he worked for a number of newspapers in Kampala, and published his own pictorial magazine, Sanyu. He later studied journalism in Germany and worked as a script writer and radio presenter.

Writing
His first book, The Burning Bush (1970), depicts a herdsboy, Nakamwa-Ntette, whose narrative voice reveals the acuity of close observation. The major conflict in the novel is between Nakamwa-Ntette and the educated son of the village head and landlord. In The Outcasts (1971), Lubega presents the marginalised migrant Balaalo, despised by the dominant Baganda, for whom they herd cattle. But the hero, Karekyesi, penetrates his exploiters’ psychology and outwits them. The Great Animal Land (1971) and Cry, Jungle Children (1974), although strongly didactic, assert Lubega’s humanism as he familiarises a youthful audience with Africa’s threatened ecosystems. His Luganda semantic dictionary, Olulimi Oluganda Amakula (1995), an original work, reflects an abiding cultural concern. He is also the co-author of The Terrible Graakwa (Luganda version by Janine Corneilse, 1998), and One Dark Dark Night (Luganda version by Lesley Beake, 1998).

Published works

Novels

Children's literature

other books

Essays
"Goa: An African writer's perspective", 1964

References 

Living people
1929 births
Ugandan novelists
Ugandan male writers
Male novelists
20th-century novelists
Place of birth missing (living people)
20th-century male writers